The Island Place Historic District is a historic district at Island Place and South Main Street at Market Square in Woonsocket, Rhode Island.  The district includes six historic buildings, three of which are part of the Woonsocket Rubber Company Mill, dating from c. 1857 to c. 1919.  The other buildings in the district are the Island Machine Company (c. 1874), the Barnai Worsted Company Dyeworks (c. 1919), and a wood-frame structure (c. 1870), that is the last surviving elements of the Wilkins Manufacturing Company.  The district is bounded by Market Square, Bernon Street, and a bend in the Blackstone River.  The site is now home to the Museum of Work & Culture, a project of the Rhode Island Historical Society.

The district was listed on the National Register of Historic Places in 1990;  the Woonsocket Rubbert Company property was also listed separately in 1989.

See also
National Register of Historic Places listings in Providence County, Rhode Island

References

External links
Museum of Work & Culture

Historic districts in Providence County, Rhode Island
Woonsocket, Rhode Island
Historic districts on the National Register of Historic Places in Rhode Island
National Register of Historic Places in Providence County, Rhode Island